Bendix Harms (born in 1967, in Münster, Germany) is a contemporary artist. He studied at the Hochschule für bildende Künste Hamburg, MFA, 1991–1997. He lives and works in Hamburg, Germany. His work has been shown in the Prague Biennial (2005) and the first Tirana Biennale (2001). In the fall of 2004, he made his New York City debut alongside John Bock at Anton Kern Gallery.

Bendix comments on his mode of painting stating, “[…] I love artists’ late works—when they
display a completely free style because it no longer matters whether their work will earn them applause or
a rap over the knuckles. They're beyond all concepts. And I love artists who anticipate their late work.

Exhibitions
 2009 Sabine Knust, Munich, Germany
 Until the End of the World, Andres Melas Presents, Athens, Greece
 2008 Lebenslieben, Anton Kern Gallery, New York
 Friends and Family, Anton Kern Gallery, New York
 Galería Heinrich Ehrhardt, Madrid
 2007 Burg Uns, Sabine Knust Gallery, Munich
 Size Matters: XXL, HVCCA–Hudson Valley Center for Contemporary Art,
 Peekskill, NY
 The Sorcerer's Apprentice: Late Picasso & Contemporary Painters, Galleri
 Faurschou, Copenhagen (cat)
 2006 Solid As A Rock, Anton Kern Gallery, New York
 Bold Moves, Scenic, New York
 2005 Prague Biennial, Prague, Czech
 2004 Which Feeder? Two-person show with John Bock, Anton Kern Gallery, NY
 2001 Musterkarte, Modelos de pintura en Alemania, Galeria Elba Benitez, Madrid;
 Galerie Heinrich Ehrhardt, Conde Duque
 Tirana Biennale 1, National Gallery + Chinese Pavilion, Tirana, Albanian
 Major Sponsen–ahead, Galerie Heinrich Ehrhardt, Madrid, Spain
 2000 Galerie Karin Guenther, Hamburg, Germany
 1998 Harms Hirsig Jung, Galerie Philomene Magers, Cologne, Germany
 Salon 98, Galerie Bärbel Grässlin bei Tishman+Speyer Properties Messeturm,
 Frankfurt, Germany
 Hirsig Harms Jung, Galerie

References

1967 births
Living people
German contemporary artists